Krisztian Palkovics (born July 10, 1975 in Székesfehérvár, Hungary) is a retired Hungarian professional ice hockey right-winger.

Career statistics

References

1975 births
Fehérvár AV19 players
Hungarian ice hockey players
Living people